The Shire of Caboolture was a local government area located in the Australian state of Queensland on the northern urban fringe of the capital, Brisbane, and south of the Sunshine Coast.

History

Caboolture Division was created on 11 November 1879 as one of 74 divisions around Queensland under the Divisional Boards Act 1879. It was centred on Caboolture, which was at that time a small logging town, and initially covered all of Moreton Bay and much of the Sunshine Coast, but by 1890 had shrunk considerably with the separate incorporation of the Pine Division (21 January 1888), Redcliffe Division (5 April 1888) and Maroochy Division (5 July 1890).

Caboolture Division became the Shire of Caboolture on 31 March 1903 after the Local Authorities Act 1902 was enacted.

On 15 March 2008, under the Local Government (Reform Implementation) Act 2007 passed by the Parliament of Queensland on 10 August 2007, the Shire of Caboolture merged with the City of Redcliffe and the Shire of Pine Rivers to form the Moreton Bay Region.

Suburbs and towns
The Shire of Caboolture included the following suburbs:

Coastal Caboolture region:
 Beachmere
 Bellmere
 Burpengary
 Burpengary East
 Caboolture
 Caboolture South
 Deception Bay
 Donnybrook
 Elimbah
 Godwin Beach
 Meldale
 Moodlu
 Morayfield
 Narangba
 Ningi
 Sandstone Point
 Toorbul
 Upper Caboolture

Inland Caboolture region:
 Bellthorpe
 Booroobin
 Bracalba
 Campbells Pocket
 Cedarton
 Commissioners Flat
 D'Aguilar
 Delaneys Creek
 Moorina
 Mount Delaney
 Mount Mee
 Neurum
 Rocksberg
 Stanmore
 Stony Creek
 Wamuran
 Wamuran Basin
 Woodford

Bribie Island:
 Banksia Beach
 Bellara
 Bongaree
 Bribie Island NP
 Welsby
 White Patch
 Woorim

Population

Chairmen and mayors
 1881: William Pettigrew 
 1927: Anders Anderson Fredin 
1991-1994  Patricia Rhoda (Pat)  Camilleri 
 2000-2008: Joy Leishman

References

External links
 University of Queensland: Queensland Places: Caboolture Shire
 

Former local government areas of Queensland
1879 establishments in Australia
2008 disestablishments in Australia
Populated places disestablished in 2008